The Guamá River is located in northeast Pará state in north-central Brazil. Its mouth forms the southern border of the state capital, Belém. The navigability is feasible in the last  of the river, from the municipality of São Miguel do Guamá to Guajará Bay. Among its tributaries, the Acará, Capim and Moju rivers stand out. In the Guamá River, the pororoca phenomenon usually occurs. The main campus of the Federal University of Pará, near Belém, is located on its right bank. About 75% of the water consumed in Belém comes from this river, which receives 11 streams contaminated by the irregular disposal of urban waste, since only 4, 5% of the home network of the Pará capital is connected to the collecting network.

The Gurupí, Capim and Guamá rivers flow into the mouth of the Amazon and are affected by the daily tides, which force water from the Amazon upstream.
They are in the Tocantins–Araguaia–Maranhão moist forests ecoregion.

See also 
List of rivers of Pará

References

Sources

Rivers of Pará